Wequiock is an unincorporated community located in the town of Scott, Brown County, Wisconsin, United States.

References

External links 
Wequiock Falls County Park, north parking lot (Google Streetview)
Wequiock Falls County Park, driveway to south parking lot (Google Streetview)

Unincorporated communities in Brown County, Wisconsin
Unincorporated communities in Wisconsin